That's What Friends Are For is a 1981 album by the Northern Irish band the Moondogs. A boot re-issue of this LP with a different inner sleeve was released in Germany in 1999. It included three bonus tracks taken from 7" releases.

Track listing

Side one
"I Wanna Be a Pop Star"
"Who's Gonna Tell Mary?"
"That's The Way It Goes"
"That's What Friends Are For"
"Schoolgirl Crush"
"I Lit a Fire"

Side two
"Home Is Where the Heart Is"
"Dream Girl"
"Zulu"
"This Girl"
"I'm Not Sleeping"
"Dressed to Kill"

Personnel
The Moondogs
Gerry McCandless - guitar, vocals
Jackie Hamilton - bass, vocals
Austin Barrett - drums

The Moondogs albums
1981 debut albums
Albums produced by Todd Rundgren